Plasmodium caucasica is a parasite of the genus Plasmodium subgenus Sauramoeba.  As in all Plasmodium species, P. caucasica has both vertebrate and insect hosts. The vertebrate hosts for this parasite are reptiles.

Description 
The parasite was first described by Telford in 2013. Meronts are very large (11-21 x 8-17 microns) and produce 32-67 merozoites each. The gametocytes are ovoid to elongate and measure 6-14 x 2.5-6 microns.

Distribution 
This species is found in Azerbaijan.

Hosts
This species infects the rock agama Paralaudakia caucasia.

Vectors
Not known.

References 

carmelinoi